Doto hystrix is a species of sea slug, a nudibranch, a marine gastropod mollusc in the family Dotidae.

Distribution
This species was first described from Sherkin Island, Ireland. Additional specimens from the Scilly Isles were included in the original description. It has subsequently been reported widely in Britain and Ireland, usually from water deeper than 20 metres.

Description
This nudibranch is uniformly brown in colour with diffuse paler markings.

EcologyDoto hystrix feeds on the hydroid Schizotricha frutescens'', family Halopterididae.

References

Dotidae
Gastropods described in 1981